The Bade languages (also known as B.1 West Chadic or the Bade–Ngizim languages) are a branch of West Chadic languages that are spoken in Borno State and Jigawa State of northern Nigeria. Bade is the most widely spoken language with 250,000 speakers, followed by Ngizim with 80,000 speakers.

Languages
The Bade languages are:

Duwai
Bade
Shira (†)
Ngizim
Teshenawa (†)
Auyokawa (†)

Names and locations
Below is a comprehensive list of Bade language names, populations, and locations from Blench (2019).

References

External links
 UCLA Yobe Languages Project

West Chadic languages
Languages of Nigeria